Baryshsky (masculine), Baryshskaya (feminine), or Baryshskoye (neuter) may refer to:
Baryshsky District, a district of Ulyanovsk Oblast, Russia
Baryshskoye Urban Settlement, a municipal formation which the town of district significance of Barysh in Baryshsky District of Ulyanovsk Oblast, Russia is incorporated as